"Waiting Room" is a song by the American post-hardcore band Fugazi. The song was first released as the opening track to their debut EP, and was later compiled on their widely acclaimed and commercially successful compilation 13 Songs. Featuring stylistic influences from funk, hip-hop and reggae, the song typifies Fugazi's signature style of post-hardcore and would go on to become one of their most popular and widely covered songs despite never being released as a single.

Background

The song was inspired by the short-lived nature of (then-lead vocalist) Ian MacKaye's previous band Embrace. Wanting to ensure the longevity of his new project, he was "absolutely determined that he was not going to make the same mistakes this time around [...] It's his song about waiting for the right people and the right moment."

Versions

The earliest recorded version of the track appears on the first instalment of the Fugazi Live Series (the band's first live show—a benefit concert for Positive Force), recorded at the Wilson Center in Washington D.C. on September 3, 1987 when Picciotto hadn't yet joined the band. Months later, in January 1988, the band recorded a studio version of the song with Don Zientara, which ended up on their first demo tape.

The definitive and most well-known version of the song was recorded in June that year with Ted Niceley at Inner Ear Studios. Initially released on their debut EP, the track would also appear on 13 Songs.

Composition
The early versions of the song were described as being slower and "dirge"-like, whilst the definitive version has an "andante moderato" ("walking" to "moderate") tempo of 92 BPM.

Stylistically, Andy Kellman of AllMusic noted the song's "relentless ska/reggae-inflicted drive", calling its sudden "drop into silence that occurs at the 22-second mark" attention-grabbing. Joe Lally's bass riff on the song has been described as "circular", funk-influenced and "catchy". Merely a backing vocalist at this point in the band, Guy Picciotto's contributions to the song have earned comparisons to that of Flavor Flav of Public Enemy, in that he acts as a "foil" to MacKaye. The song's "tense [...] verses explode into a heavy metallic chorus" in a way reminiscent of an "impatient call to action" even though thematically, the song "is about carefully getting one's ducks in a row".

Reception
The song has been widely acclaimed as one of the band's best and most popular songs. According to Blake Butler: "Ask the common punk rock listening kid, who may not know too much about music, what they know of Fugazi and they will probably mention fairly soon the impact that hearing "Waiting Room" had on them." A similar point was made by Verbicide, who wrote that the song "is to Fugazi what “Smells Like Teen Spirit” is to Nirvana—the one song that you know, even if you know no others." "While the band's sound would continue to grow over the arc of its existence," wrote Jes Skolnik for Pitchfork, ""Waiting Room" is the song that first defined them, and continues to reverberate with fans new and old." It has even been called "the band's de facto “hit song”." According to Quicksand lead singer Walter Schreifels, "everything that's great about Fugazi is spelled out within the first verse and chorus of ‘Waiting Room.’ Within the first 15 seconds of the song, you knew you didn't need to compare it to Minor Threat anymore. [That song] was an event that changed the meaning of everything that came before it."

Legacy

Covers and samples

The song has been covered "by a remarkably diverse roster of artists" since its release in 1988. "In the quarter-century since it was first performed," writes Verbicide magazine in an article listing ten different covers of the track, "“Waiting Room” has become a go-to song for rock bands looking to ingratiate themselves to an audience and gain some cred, as well as those simply wishing to share their love of a band that flies under the radar of the mainstream." The Washington Post had even labelled 2011 as "the year of the Fugazi cover" due to the number of bands and musicians that had covered the song (as well as others by the band) that year.

"Waiting Room" has been covered—both live and otherwise—by Red Hot Chili Peppers, Arcade Fire, Mustard Plug, The Wildhearts, Ryan Adams, Atom and His Package, Minus The Bear, Billy Talent, Anti-Flag, Billy Squier, Dead Milkmen, The Ex, Jimmie's Chicken Shack, The Cryptkeeper Five, Osaka Popstar, Rubblebucket, AWOLNATION, and TV on the Radio.

Both MC Lars and Girl Talk have sampled the song on their tracks "No Logo" and "Let It Out" respectively.

In popular culture
The song is frequently played at Washington Commanders football games at FedExField. Actor Jack Black has lip-synched to the song as a part of his #RadOnes series of lip-sync videos.

Accolades
As of January 2021, aggregator website Acclaimed Music finds "Waiting Room" to be the 541st most acclaimed song of all time.

Personnel
 Ian MacKaye – vocals, guitar
 Guy Picciotto – vocals
 Joe Lally – bass
 Brendan Canty – drums

References

1988 songs
Fugazi songs